Ivan Dashev Radoev (also spelled  Iwan Radoew) (March 30, 1927 in Pordim, Bulgaria – July 10, 1994)  was a   lyrical poet and playwright from Bulgaria.

Biography
Radoev's plays have been translated into more than 12 languages and performed in the multiple countries, from Cuba to Mongolia. In 1992 he received the Special Award for lifetime achievement from the International Academy of Arts in France. Radoev wrote about crippled emotions, failing relationships and the need for love. But ever present in the background was the clash between the need for personal freedom and the growing social pressure of the totalitarian state where ideology could not tolerate individualism."

Upon Radoev's death in 1994, the Pleven municipal theater in Plevin Bulgaria was renamed Ivan Radoev Dramatic Theatre

Works

Among his most important books of poetry are: "Spring dawn. Poems "(1953)," Poems "(1958)," a ballad poem "(1960)," A white sheet "(1975)," Poems and Poems "(1978)," Bad dreams. Poems "(1987)," White sinking. Weighing machine. Phoenix "(1992) and "My Children Are Words"(1994). He was one of the founders of lyric drama in Bulgaria with plays including "The world is small," "Great Comeback", "Red and Brown", "Sadat and Orpheus", "Cannibal", "Bull", "Miracle", and "Sun".

Translations into English
"Ivan Radoev Three Poems" translated by Kapka Kassabova
"My Children Are Words" translated by Don D. Wilson

Filmography
Chudo (1996) (TV) (play) aka "A Miracle" - Europe (English title) (
"Petimata ot RMS" (1977) TV series   aka "RMS Five" - Europe (English title)
Nakovalnya ili chuk (1972) (drama "Cherveno i kafyavo") aka "Hammer or Anvil" - Europe (English title)
Avtostop (1972)  aka "Hitchhiking" - Europe (English title)

References 

1927 births
1994 deaths
Bulgarian male poets
People from Pleven Province
20th-century Bulgarian poets
20th-century male writers